Changqi Village is a village in Anjiang (formerly in the southeastern part of Longtian Township), Hongjiang City, Huaihua, which is located in the western part of Hunan Province, China.  it had a population of about 1,400. Most of the villagers share the same surname, Duan, and there is an ancestral shrine specifically for all the people surnamed Duan.

Agriculture
The village is the origin of what eventually became the Qianyang Bingtang orange cultivar (黔阳冰糖橙), which is a famous product of Hongjiang. The predecessor of what was eventually cultivated into today's Qianyang Bingtang orange was discovered in the 1960s by Changqi village resident Duan Tianlong (段天郎).

References

Huaihua
Villages in China